The 2014 America East women's basketball tournament began on March 7 and concluded with the championship game on March 10 at SEFCU Arena in Albany, NY. The winner earned an automatic bid to the 2014 NCAA tournament.

Bracket and results

All times listed are Eastern

External links
 2014 America East Womens Basketball Championship

See also
America East Conference
2014 America East men's basketball tournament

References

Tournament
America East Conference women's basketball tournament